Uma is an upcoming Indian Hindi-language film directed by Tathagata Singha. The film is produced by Avishek Ghosh and Mantraraj Paliwal. The film stars Kajal Aggarwal, Tinnu Anand, Harsh Chhaya, Gaurav Sharma and Ayoshi Talukdar.

Cast
Kajal Aggarwal
Tinnu Anand
Harsh Chhaya
Meghana Malik
Gaurav Sharma
Shriswara 
Ayoshi Talukdar

References

External links 
 
 Uma

Upcoming Hindi-language films
Upcoming Indian films